This is the first of two albums released in 1998 by Jamaican Dancehall/Reggae artist Lady Saw.  This is a best of compilation featuring her best hits.  This album was well received and rated 4.5 stars by [ AMG].

Track listing

Sources 
 

Lady Saw albums
1998 albums